Mohamed Adan is a Somali politician. He is the State Minister for Foreign Affairs of Somalia, having been appointed to the position on 12 January 2015 by Prime Minister Omar Abdirashid Ali Sharmarke.

References

Year of birth missing (living people)
Living people
Government ministers of Somalia